Plakortis insularis is a species of marine sponge in the order Homosclerophorida, first described in 2003 by Moraes and Guilherme Muricy, from specimens collected from oceanic islands off north-eastern Brazil.

References

Homoscleromorpha
Animals described in 2003
Taxa named by Guilherme Muricy